Libido is the sixteenth album by experimental French singer Brigitte Fontaine, released in 2006 on the Polydor label. It once again features a collaboration with -M- on the song Mister Mystère, which -M- also sang solo on his fourth album, to which it gave its title. Brigitte Fontaine, for the first time in more than thirty years, calls upon arranger Jean-Claude Vannier for some songs, Barbe à papa and Mendelssohn. The title of Château intérieur comes from a book by Teresa of Ávila, although Fontaine admitted she didn't read it.

Track listing

Personnel
 Lyrics: Brigitte Fontaine
 Music: Areski Belkacem except 6, 7 composed by Jean-Claude Vannier, 11 composed by -M-.
 Direction: Areski Belkacem except 7 (Jean-Claude Vannier), 11 (-M-).
 Editions Allo Music/Labo M Edition & Jean-Claude Vannier éditions

Charts

References

Brigitte Fontaine albums
2006 albums